This article lists links to articles relating to the ongoing COVID-19 pandemic within the Crown Dependencies.

Guernsey

Isle of Man

Jersey